Hymenopenaeus doris is a species of prawn in the family Solenoceridae. The species lives in the Eastern Pacific in areas like Mexico, Peru, and Costa Rica, from depths of 549 to 4802 meters.

The defense mechanism of H. doris is to play dead in order to avoid predation; drifting motionless while playing dead, having the name "zombie shrimp". This might also be a way of saving energy, since the depth they live at disallows animals to swim rapidly for long periods of time due to the little oxygen.

References 

Crustaceans of the Pacific Ocean
Crustaceans of North America
Arthropods of Mexico
Invertebrates of Peru
Crustaceans described in 1893
Taxa named by Walter Faxon
Solenoceridae